Champhai (Pron:/tʃamˈpʰaɪ/) is a border town in Mizoram state, in far eastern India. It is the headquarters of Champhai district, one of the eleven districts in the state. It is located on the Indo-Myanmar border and is situated in a strategically important location. Because of this, it is the main business corridor for India and Myanmar in the area.

History 
Champhai was the headquarters of Lalbura Sailo, son of Vanhnuailiana, a Mizo Chief against whom the British Expedition of 1871–72 was directed. It was accorded the status of a fort during the British period. The Champhai Valley was once a lake and was gradually silted to obliterate the lake. The soil of the plain was still uncultivated during the Lushai Expedition of 1872. Irrigated rice cultivation started in Champhai in the year 1898 encouraged by the British Colonial Authorities to supply rice for their soldiers and laborers. As of 1922, there was only 1 shop in Champhai. On 1 March 1966, the MNF declared unilateral Mizo Independence and attacked Assam Rifles post at  Champhai.

Economy 
The economy of Champhai is mainly agriculture and border trade. Champhai is also the main trading centre of Mizoram with goods like clothes, silverware and electronics imported from Myanmar through the trading post in Zokhawthar. It has a flatland measuring 113 kilometres long and 48 kilometres in width for wet rice cultivation which can produce 19,200 quintals of rice per year. 10,000 quintals of grape were cultivated in 2011 alone churning 20,000 bottles a year. These are the two main agricultural products.

Climate 
Champhai has a moderate climate. In winter, the temperature varies from 10 °C to 20 °C and between 15 °C and 30 °C in summer.

Education 
Champhai College is the only institution for higher education in the town. However, there are many government owned and privately run schools operating here.

Media 
The Major Media in Champhai are:
 Lenrual
 Pasaltha
 Rihlipui
 CCN (Digital TV Operator)
 LCN (Digital TV Operator)

Transport 
A helicopter service by Pawan Hans has been started which connects the Aizawl  with Champhai. The distance between Champhai and Aizawl is 194 km and is connected with regular service of bus and maxi cab.

References

External links 

 Champhai.nic.in : The first official district site of Champhai town
 Champhai Blog
 Champhai.net : Champhai Daily News